"Scuse Me While I Miss the Sky" is the sixteenth episode of the fourteenth season of the American animated television series The Simpsons. It originally aired on the Fox network in the United States on March 30, 2003.

Plot
Declan Desmond, an opinionated British documentary film producer, films a documentary at Springfield Elementary School on the students' lives. He interviews Bart as he gets hit by a ball of dirt thrown by Nelson and breaks down in tears. Later, Declan belittles Lisa as she talks about the multiplicity of her interests, insinuating that she could neither be happy nor successful juggling too many hobbies or passions. Hurt by his criticism, Lisa resolves to find a single passion to which she can devote herself; astronomy. She convinces Homer to buy her a telescope, but discovers that light pollution from the city is blocking her view of the sky. After a discussion with Professor Frink, Lisa starts a petition to reduce the city's light pollution. After gaining enough signatures, Mayor Quimby agrees to turn off the streetlights, leading to a clear view of the stars, at which many people from Springfield marvel.

Meanwhile, Bart is looking for a way to regain his popularity after being humiliated. After seeing Nelson parading around with stolen car hood ornaments, he decides to steal one off Fat Tony's car. Milhouse and Bart are foiled on their first attempt because Quimby is pressured to switch the lights back on due to rising crime. Yet the light level is set too high which means that no one can sleep so Lisa, still wanting to see the light pollution reduced, and Bart, still wanting to steal Fat Tony's hood ornament, take a now sleep-deprived Homer to the power plant and overload the generators causing a power outage, which ends the light pollution, but before the angry citizens can attack, Lisa points out a meteor shower and the town looks on in wonderment while Bart sneaks off and steals Fat Tony's hood ornament, with Don McLean's song "Vincent" playing in the background.

The show ends with a montage of clips from Declan's documentary.

Production
By this time in the show's history, there had been an "ever-present fear that as the show ages it risks 'jumping the shark. The Simpsons writers satirized the term's namesake (an episode of Happy Days in which Fonzie jumps over a shark on water skis) in the episode, which has a couch gag where the Simpson family jump over a tank full of sharks in a similar fashion (the gag had previously been used in the episode "How I Spent My Strummer Vacation"). Executive producer Al Jean said, "We figured that if we said it first, then they couldn't say it". The writers included a line where Carl Carlson mentions his Icelandic heritage, as well as the fact that Homer, Moe and Lenny show absolutely no interest in what he's saying. This would later become both the basis and an explicit reference point in the episode The Saga of Carl, where Carl rips off the winnings from a lottery ticket he jointly purchased with the gang before returning to Iceland, and telling them when they track him down that he did steal the money and isn't sorry because they're not friends, as "friends care that their friends are from Iceland!"

Critical reception
Director Steven Dean Moore won an Annie Award in the category of Best Directing in an Animated Television Production for this episode. The episode was also nominated for an Environmental Media Award for Best Television Episodic Comedy.

English musician Jake Bugg credits hearing Don McLean's "Vincent" in this episode as his formative musical moment.

References

External links

The Simpsons (season 14) episodes
2003 American television episodes
Light pollution